Oscar Aga (born 6 January 2001) is a Norwegian footballer who plays as a forward for Rosenborg in the Eliteserien.

Coming through the youth ranks of Lyn and Stabæk, he made his Eliteserien debut in April 2018 against Brann. He scored his first goals in the 2019 Norwegian Football Cup, 5 goals in 3 matches. He was loaned out to Grorud at the closing of the summer 2019 transfer window. In 2021 Oscar Aga made the move to the swedish club IF Elfsborg and signed a contract that extends to 2025.

6 March 2023, Aga signed for Rosenborg on a deal until the end of 2026.

Career statistics

Club

Honours
Individual
Norwegian First Division top scorer: 2021

References

2001 births
Living people
Footballers from Oslo
Association football forwards
Norwegian footballers
Stabæk Fotball players
Grorud IL players
IF Elfsborg players
Eliteserien players
Norwegian First Division players
Norwegian Second Division players
Norway youth international footballers
Norwegian expatriate footballers
Expatriate footballers in Sweden
Norwegian expatriate sportspeople in Sweden